Jamelaa (ஜமீலா) is a 2022 Indian-Tamil-language family drama television series airing on Colors Tamil. The series stars Tanvi Rao and Ajay. It premiered on Colors Tamil on 10 October 2022 and ended on 12 January 2023 with 70 episodes. It is available for streaming in select markets on Voot. The show is produced by Rayane Mithun under Radaan Mediaworks.

The series is set in an Islamic background as a new venture in the world of Tamil serials.

Cast

Main cast

Recurring cast

Production

Casting
Newcomer Kannada television actress Tanvi Rao was cast in the female lead role as Jamelaa. Newcomer Ajay portrayed male lead role AK. Gowtham Sundararajan was cast as Hanifa. Aishwarya portrayed Saleema. Poovilangu Mohan was cast as AK's father Dakshinamurthy. Meera Krishnan was selected to play AK's mother Maragatham.

Development
At the end of May end 2022, Colors Tamil confirmed through a press release that it would distribute a new Tamil Muslim series, to be produced by Rayane R Mithun under Radaan Mediaworks. It was scheduled to premiere on 22 August 2022, but due to some issues, the series went on air on 10 October 2022.

Release
The first promo was unveiled on 14 July 2022. In the series' opening shot, a Muslim woman stands wearing a burqa. Only her eyes are visible. The title of the series in Arabic style was released as "Jameela." The second promo was unveiled on 28 August 2022, featuring Jamelaa's face and revealing the release date. The third song promo was unveiled on 4 September 2022, featuring Jameela and her family. The fourth promo was unveiled on 22 September 2022, featuring AK and Jamelaa meeting.

References

Colors Tamil original programming
Tamil-language romance television series
2022 Tamil-language television series debuts
Tamil-language television shows
Television shows set in Tamil Nadu
2023 Tamil-language television series endings